Xanthaciura thetis is a species of tephritid or fruit flies in the genus Xanthaciura of the family Tephritidae.

Distribution
Bolivia.

References

Tephritinae
Insects described in 1914
Diptera of South America